Wanna Sirivadhanabhakdi (2 March 1943–17 March 2023) was a Thai business woman. She was the wife of Thai Chinese billionaire business magnate Charoen Sirivadhanabhakdi.
She served several executive positions in the Sirivadhanabhakdi family's business empire, including as Vice-Chairwoman of ThaiBev.

References

1943 births
2023 deaths
Wanna Sirivadhanabhakdi
Wanna Sirivadhanabhakdi
Wanna Sirivadhanabhakdi